This is a list of American restaurateurs. A restaurateur is a person who opens and runs restaurants professionally. Although over time the term has come to describe any person who owns a restaurant, traditionally it refers to a highly skilled professional who is proficient in all aspects of the restaurant business.

A

 Dolores Alexander 
 Ben Ali
 Roy W. Allen 
 Linda G. Alvarado 
 Ignacio Anaya
 David W. Anderson 
 Stuart Anderson
 Hiroaki Aoki 
 Andrea Apuzzo 
 Ken Aretsky
 Donatella Arpaia 
 Anthony Athanas

B

 E. S. Babcock 
 Damon Baehrel 
 Jean-Claude Baker
 Kim Bartmann 
 Paul Bartolotta 
 Joe Bastianich 
 Lidia Bastianich 
 Mario Batali 
 Joe Baum 
 Bob Baumhower 
 Rick Bayless 
 Victor Bergeron 
 Maurice Bessinger 
 Sherman Billingsley 
 Bill Binder 
 Jamie Bissonnette 
 Richard Blais 
 Thomas Boggs 
 Justin Bogle 
 Ettore Boiardi 
 Ghulam Bombaywala 
 David Bouley 
 Danny Bowien 
 Henry L. Bowles 
 Gary Brackett 
 Ella Brennan 
 Owen Brennan 
 Ralph Brennan 
 Richard Brennan (restaurateur)
 Terrance Brennan 
 Coby G. Brooks 
 Robert H. Brooks 
 Warren Bruno 
 Artur Bryant 
 Peter Buck 
 Aaron Buerge 
 Sandra Bullock 
 Jim Bunch 
 David Burke 
 Ernie Byfield

C

 Alex Cable 
 Karyn Calabrese 
 Don Callender 
 Ransom M. Callicott 
 Adrianne Calvo  
 S. Truett Cathy 
 David Chang 
 Sam Chang 
 Leah Chase 
 Chris Chelios 
 Cecilia Chiang 
 Leeann Chin 
 Bob Chinn 
 Jeffrey Chodorow 
 Maneet Chauhan 
 Michael Chow 
 Ruby Chow 
 Sam Choy 
 Jim Churchill 
 Dick Clark 
 Patrick Clark 
 Clifford Clinton 
 Tyson Cole 
 Tom Colicchio 
 Sean Combs 
 Scott Conant 
 Al Copeland 
 Michael Cordúa 
 Dave Corriveau 
 Percy Creuzot 
 Ingrid Croce

D

 Michael DeBatt 
 Bobby Deen 
 Paula Deen 
 Tom Dempsey 
 Grant DePorter 
 Richard Dermer 
 Traci Des Jardins 
 Mark DeSaulnier 
 Marcel Desaulniers 
 Steve DiFillippo 
 James Disbrow 
 Rocco DiSpirito 
 Tom Douglas 
 Josh Duhamel 
 Henry R. Durand

E

 E-40 
 Clint Eastwood 
 Robert Egan 
 Graham Elliot 
 Steve Ells 
 Todd English 
 Friedman Paul Erhardt 
 Bob Evans

F

 Tiffani Faison 
 Robert Fennell 
 Guy Fieri 
 Stink Fisher 
 Adam Fleischman 
 Paul Fleming 
 John Folse 
 Benson Fong 
 Lee Tung Foo 
 Shelly Frank

G

 Jean Galatoire 
 Helen Gallagher 
 Joe Gannon 
 Charlie Geren 
 Izzy Gomez 
 Glenn Goodart 
 Frank Gordy 
 Harold Greiner 
 Carol Grimaldi 
 Nelson G. Gross 
 William J. Guste

H

 Mel Haber 
 Alan Hale, Jr. 
 William P. Halliday 
 Gordon Hamersley 
 Nathan Handwerker 
 Pete Harman 
 Tim Harman 
 Irene Hayes 
 Dave Heaton 
 Irwin Held 
 John Hickenlooper 
 Henry Hill 
 Charles T. Hinde 
 Ted Hinton 
 Tanya Holland 
 Adina Howard 
 Eddie Huang 
 Howard Hughes 
 Andy Husbands 
 Chrissie Hynde

J

 Andrew Jarvis 
 Doron Jensen 
 Howard Deering Johnson 
 Jean Joho 
 Peter Jubeck 
 Jean Baptiste Gilbert Payplat dis Julien

K

 Johnny Kan
 Burt Katz 
 Elaine Kaufman 
 Anne Kearney 
 Jim Keet 
 Thomas Keller
 Matthew Kenney 
 David Kim  
 Tony Knowles 
 James Koskiniemi 
 Ray Kroc 
 Pat Kuleto 
 Ashton Kutcher 
 Nancy Kwan

L

 Emeril Lagasse
 Nicholas Lambrinides 
 George Lang 
 Ninfa Laurenzo 
 Calvin B. T. Lee 
 August Heinrich Lehmann 
 Warner LeRoy 
 Harry Lewis 
 Paul Liebrandt 
 Bruce Littlefield 
 Anita Lo 
 Antonia Lofaso 
 Eva Longoria 
 J. M. Lozano 
 Paul Luna 
 Barbara Lynch

M

 Lester Maddox 
 Peyton Manning 
 George Mardikian 
 Herman Marth 
 Mariano Martinez 
 George Mavrothalassitis 
 Tony Maws 
 Michael McCarty
 William McCormick 
 Billy McGlory 
 Robert "Say" McIntosh 
 Brian McMenamin 
 Thomas McNaughton 
 Sean Meenan 
 Rich Melman 
 Sarma Melngailis 
 Julie Menin 
 Danny Meyer
 Mary Sue Milliken 
 Michael Mina 
 Arnie Morton 
 Michael Morton 
 John Mosca 
 John A. Mulheren 
 Marc Murphy 
 Terrence Murphy 
 Kimbal Musk 
 Anthony Myint

N

 Gavin Newsom 
 Julian Niccolini 
 Drew Nieporent
 Greg Norton 
 John Nygren

O

 Louis P. Ober 
 Patrick O'Connell 
 Patrick O'Neal 
 Suze Orman

P

 Chris Paciello 
 Alex Paez 
 Frank Palumbo 
 Nicola Paone 
 Dellamarie Parrilli 
 Daniel Patterson 
 Cindy Pawlcyn 
 Bob Payton 
 Mark Peel (chef)
 Frank Pellegrino 
 Claude Philippe 
 Harold Pierce 
 Odessa Piper 
 Stacey Poon-Kinney 
 Michael Psilakis 
 Wolfgang Puck

R

 Jay Ramras 
 Bill Rancic 
 Giuliana Rancic 
 O.L. Rapson 
 Kent Rathbun 
 Rachael Ray 
 Mason Reese 
 Tony Rezko 
 Pascal Rigo 
 Jilly Rizzo 
 David Robinson  
 Nate Robinson 
 Phil Romano 
 Michael Romanoff 
 Romany Marie 
 Steve Rubell

S

 Jeffrey Saad 
 Henry Salgado 
 Marcus Samuelsson 
 Aaron Sanchez 
 Colonel Sanders 
 Chris Santos 
 Bobby Schilling 
 Chris Schlesinger 
 Alex Schoenbaum 
 John Schnatter 
 Kurt W. Schuller 
 Arnold Schwarzenegger 
 Patrick Schwarzenegger 
 Daniel R. Scoggin 
 Larry Sconyers 
 James Scurlock 
 Adam Senn 
 Clyde Serda 
 Ike Sewell 
 Andy Shallal 
 Louis Sherry 
 Lydia Shire 
 Toots Shor 
 Nancy Silverton 
 Richard Simmons 
 Alvin Simon 
 Kerry Simon 
 B. Smith 
 Martin V. Smith 
 Arthur K. Snyder 
 Thomas N. Soffron 
 Jack Solomon (Gallagher's Steakhouse)
 Felix Stehling 
 Frank Stephenson 
 Lynn D. Stewart 
 Michael Stipe 
 Robert A. Straniere 
 Christopher B. "Stubb" Stubblefield 
 Phil Suarez 
 Michael Symon

T

 Jon Taffer 
 Dan Tana 
 Joe Theismann
 Dave Thomas
 Frederick Bruce Thomas 
 Joe Thum 
 Felix Tijerina 
 Jet Tila 
 Justin Timberlake 
 Sue Torres 
 Charlie Trotter 
 Donald Trump 
 Ming Tsai 
 Tom Tunney

U

 Stephen A. Unger

V

 Donald Valle 
 Richard Valle 
 John Vartan 
 Primo Villanueva 
 Michael Voltaggio

W

 Michael Walrath 
 Alice Waters
 Cornell Webster 
 Charles Weeghman 
 Barton G. Weiss 
 Kanye West 
 Cathy Whims
 Jasper White 
 Michael Whiteman 
 Art Whizin 
 Bob Wian 
 Robert Wiedmaier 
 Jody Williams 
 Brooke Williamson
 Alan Wilzig 
 Barry Wine 
 Brad Womack 
 Donald Wong 
 Sylvia Woods 
 Shannon Wynne

Y

 Bon Yagi 
 Mario Yagobi 
 Lovie Yancey 
 Steven Yeun 
 Sang Yoon

Z

 Geoffrey Zakarian
 Duke Zeibert 
 Frederick Hinde Zimmerman 
 Steve Zolotow

See also
 List of Michelin 3-star restaurants in the United States
 Lists of Americans

References

Further reading
 

Restaurateurs

Restaurateurs